Mokhtar Nourafshan is a paralympic athlete from Iran competing mainly in category F53 throwing events.

Mokhtar first competed in the Paralympics in 1988 where he threw the javelin and discus, winning the gold medal in the later. He missed the 1992 games but returned in 1996 Summer Paralympics to win gold in the f53 javelin and silver in the F53 discus and shot put. He didn't attempt to defend his javelin title in the 2000 Summer Paralympics but did win both the discus and shot put titles in the F54 class. In 2004, he returned to the javelin but failed to medal in the F55-56 joint class and won bronze in the F55 discus.

References

External links
 

Paralympic athletes of Iran
Athletes (track and field) at the 1988 Summer Paralympics
Athletes (track and field) at the 1996 Summer Paralympics
Athletes (track and field) at the 2000 Summer Paralympics
Athletes (track and field) at the 2004 Summer Paralympics
Paralympic gold medalists for Iran
Paralympic silver medalists for Iran
Paralympic bronze medalists for Iran
Living people
Medalists at the 1988 Summer Paralympics
Medalists at the 1996 Summer Paralympics
Medalists at the 2000 Summer Paralympics
Medalists at the 2004 Summer Paralympics
Year of birth missing (living people)
Paralympic medalists in athletics (track and field)
Iranian male discus throwers
Iranian male javelin throwers
Iranian male shot putters
Wheelchair discus throwers
Wheelchair javelin throwers
Wheelchair shot putters
Paralympic discus throwers
Paralympic javelin throwers
Paralympic shot putters
21st-century Iranian people